The 1979–80 Washington State Cougars men's basketball team represented Washington State University for the 1979–80 NCAA Division I men's basketball season. Led by eighth-year head coach George Raveling, the Cougars were members of the Pacific-10 Conference and played their home games on campus at the Performing Arts Coliseum in Pullman, Washington.

For the first time since its national runner-up finish in 1941, WSU was invited to the 48-team NCAA tournament and were seeded fifth in the Mideast region; they met twelfth seed Penn, the Ivy League champion, in the first round in West Lafayette, Indiana. The Cougars had a ten-point lead early in the second half, but it was tied at 51 with just under four minutes to go when Don Collins fouled out and Penn outscored the Cougars eleven to four.

WSU's next NCAA appearance was three years away in 1983.

Roster

Postseason result

|-
!colspan=6 style=| NCAA Tournament

References

External links
Sports Reference – Washington State Cougars: 1979–80 basketball season

Washington State Cougars men's basketball seasons
Washington State Cougars
Washington State
Washington State
Washington State